José Terrón may refer to:

José Terrón (actor) (1939–2019), Spanish player of bit parts in films
José Terrón (footballer) (born 1991), Spanish defender